Buhaina is an album by drummer Art Blakey and The Jazz Messengers recorded in 1973 and released on the Prestige label. The name comes from the name Blakey took for himself after conversion to Islam.

Reception
Allmusic awarded the album 3 stars.

Track listing 
 "Moanin'" (Bobby Timmons) – 5:31  
 "Chant for Bu" (Mickey Bass) – 8:36  
 "One for Trane" (Mickey Bass) – 6:08  
 "Mission Eternal" (Cedar Walton) – 12:10  
 "Along Came Betty" (Benny Golson) – 4:52  
 "Gertrude's Bounce" (Richie Powell) – 4:43

Personnel 
Art Blakey – drums
Woody Shaw – trumpet
Carter Jefferson – tenor saxophone, soprano saxophone
Cedar Walton – piano, electric piano
Michael Howell – guitar (tracks 2–4)
Mickey Bass – bass
Tony Waters – congas
Jon Hendricks – vocals (tracks 1 & 5)

References 

Art Blakey albums
The Jazz Messengers albums
1973 albums
Prestige Records albums
Albums produced by Orrin Keepnews